Johan Rockström (born 31 December 1965) is a Swedish scientist, internationally recognized for his work on global sustainability issues. He is joint director of the Potsdam Institute for Climate Impact Research (PIK) in Germany, together with economist Ottmar Edenhofer. He is also Professor in Earth System Science at the University of Potsdam and Professor in Water Systems and Global Sustainability, Stockholm University.

Rockström has pioneered work on the planetary boundaries framework, first published in 2009. The nine planetary boundaries presented in the framework, from climate to biodiversity, are argued to be fundamental in maintaining a "safe operating space for humanity."

Rockström is also a public intellectual, providing advice e.g. to UN institutions, speaking e.g. at TED events, and featuring in media such as the Netflix "Breaking Boundaries" film. He has published over 150 papers in fields ranging from practical land and water use to global sustainability. He is ranked among the most cited researchers in the world by Clarivate Analytics. Johan Rockström was executive director of the Stockholm Environment Institute from 2004–2012, and director of the Stockholm Resilience Centre from 2007–2018.

Career
Johan Rockström studied at the Swedish University of Agricultural Sciences in Uppsala (soil science and hydrology) and at the Institut national agronomique in Paris (agriculture) from 1987 to 1991. He received his Ph.D. in 1997 from Stockholm University, where his research was on "Systems Ecology and Natural Resource Management." Rockström's previous scientific work has included inter- and transdisciplinary topics on global water resources and land use management, as well as socio-ecological resilience and global material cycles.

In 2009, Rockström led the team that developed the Planetary Boundaries framework, a proposed precondition for facilitating human development at a time when the planet is undergoing rapid change. In recognition of this work, Fokus magazine named him "Swede of the Year" for "engaging and exciting work in sustainable development. In 2010, the magazine Miljöaktuellt ranked him the second most influential person in Sweden on environmental issues, and Veckans Affärer gave him its "Social Capitalist Award". In 2011 he chaired the third Nobel Laureate Symposium on Global Sustainability in Stockholm.

After 12 years as director of Stockholm Resilience Centre (SRC), he became the 2018 joint director of the Potsdam Institute for Climate Impact Research (PIK), based in Germany, with PIK's current deputy director Professor Ottmar Edenhofer, a climate economist. Rockström and Edenhofer follow PIK director Professor Hans Joachim Schellnhuber. He is currently member of the Board of the EAT Foundation, the KR Foundation, the Global Challenges Foundation, a fellow for Earth League as well as ch-chair of Future Earth and Earth Commission.

In 2020 he became a member of the German Academy of Sciences Leopoldina. In 2021, together with David Attenborough, Rockström appeared in the Netflix documentary "Breaking Boundaries" and also released a book called Breaking Boundaries: The Science Behind our Planet.

He has acted as speaker to various high-level international meetings and organisations, such as the World Economic Forum, the General Assembly of the United Nations (UNGA), the United Nations Sustainable Development Solutions Network (SDSN) and the United Nations Framework Convention on Climate Change Conferences (UNFCCC). Moreover, he is the Chief Scientist of Conservation International  and member of the European Investment Bank Advisory Group.

Awards
 2009 Swedish Person of the Year, by the journal Fokus, for bridging science and society
 2013 Agronomist of the Year, Agronomist Association (Swedish Association of Professional Scientists)
 2014 Woods Hole Research Center's Lawrence S. Huntington Environmental Prize
 2015 International Cosmos Prize
 2015 German Environmental Prize
 2017 Hillary Laureate
 2020 Laureate, Prince Albert II of Monaco Foundation Award

Planetary boundaries
In 2009, Rockström led an international group of 28 leading academics, who proposed a new Earth system framework for government and management agencies as a precondition for sustainable development. Recognizing that rising human pressures on climate and nature have the potential destabilize the entire Earth system, the framework posits that Earth system processes on the planet have boundaries or thresholds that should not be crossed. Staying within the safe operating space for humanity. delimited by the planetary boundaries safeguards the stable environmental conditions that made the emergence of modern societies possible in the first place and will allow coming generations to develop and thrive. The group identified nine "planetary life support systems" essential for human well-being and attempted to quantify just how far these systems have been pushed already.  They then estimated how much further we could go before the risk of "irreversible and abrupt environmental change" which could make Earth less habitable increases. Boundaries can help identify where there is room and define a "safe space for human development", which is an improvement over approaches that aim to minimize human impacts on the planet. Humanity has already transgressed five of the nine planetary boundaries putting the prospects of long-term, equitable human development at risk if permanently and substantially exceeded.

According to critics, the exact location of six of these "planetary boundaries" are not proven but arbitrary, such as the 15% limit of earth use to cropland. It is claimed that increased earth use has increased global well-being. They are also connected to local rather than global consequences. The planetary boundaries framework is not a static concept, but requires constant development to reflect progress in its scientific foundation and address the constructive debates around the framework. A broader scientific and conceptual update of the planetary boundaries was published in 2015. More recent publications focused on improving quantifications of individual boundaries, translating global to regional boundaries, interconnections and feedbacks between planetary boundaries, and the quantification of hitherto uncertain boundaries.

Other activities

Corporate boards
 Daimler, Member of the Advisory Board for Integrity and Corporate Responsibility

Non-profit organization
 Gulbenkian Prize for Humanity, Member of the Jury
 EAT Foundation, Member of the Board of Trustees
 KR Foundation, Member of the Board
 Global Challenges Foundation, Member of the Board
 Earth League, fellow
 Future Earth, co-chair
 Earth Commission, co-chair

Publications (selection)

Books 

 Johan Rockström et al.: Breaking Boundaries: The Science Behind our Planet.  DK, 2021, 
 Johan Rockström et al.: Eat Good – Das Kochbuch, das die Welt verändert. Hildesheim 2019, .

Contributions to journals 

 Rockström, J., Gupta, J., Lenton, T. M., Qin, D., Lade, S. J., Abrams, J. F., Jacobson, L., Rocha, J.C., Zimm, C., Bai, X., Bala, G., Bringezu, S., Broadgate, W., Bunn, S.E., DeClerck, F., Ebi, K.L., Gong, P., Gordon, C., Kanie, N., Liverman, D., Nakicenovic, N., Obura, D., Ramanthan, V., Verburg, P.H., van Vuuren, D.P., Winkelmann, R. (2021). Identifying a safe and just corridor for people and the planet.  Earth's Future, 9. | 10.1029/2020EF001866
 Gerten, D.; Heck, V.; Jägermeyr, J.; Bodirsky, B.L.; Fetzer, I.; Jalava, M.; Kummu, M.; Lucht, W.; Rockström, J.; Schaphoff, S.; Schellnhuber, H.J. (2020). Feeding ten billion people is possible within four terrestrial planetary boundaries. Nature Sustainability
 Lenton, T.M., Rockström, J., Gaffney, O., Rahmstorf, S., Richardson, K., Steffen, W., Schellnhuber, H.J. (2019). Climate tipping points - too risky to bet against. Nature Vol 575, pages 592-595.
 Willett, W., Rockström, J., Loken, B., Springmann, M., et.al. 2019. Food in the Anthropocene: the EAT–Lancet Commission on healthy diets from sustainable food systems. EAT-Lancet Commission on healthy diets from sustainable food systems, DOI: 10.1016/S0140-6736(18)31788-4
 Sachs, J. D., Schmidt-Traub, G., Mazzucato, M., Messner,  D., Nakicenovic, N., Rockström, J.(2019). Six Transformations to achieve the Sustainable Development Goals. Nature Sustainability, DOI 10.1038/s41893-019-0352-9.
 Steffen, W., J. Rockstrom, K. Richardson, T. M. Lenton, C. Folke, D. Liverman, C. P. Summerhayes, A. D. Barnosky, S. E. Cornell, M. Crucifix, J. F. Donges, I. Fetzer, S. J. Lade, M. Scheffer, R. Winkelmann, H. J. Schellnhuber. 2018. Trajectories of the Earth System in the Athropocene. Proceedings of the National Academy of Sciences of the United States of America 115 (33): 8252-8259.
 Rockström, J., Gaffney, O., Rogelj, J. et. al. 2017. A roadmap for rapid decarbonization. Science, Volume 355 Issue 6331: 1269-1271.
 Figueres, C., H.J. Schellnhuber, G. Whiteman, J. Rockström, A. Hobley, S. Rahmstorf. 2017. Three years to safeguard our climate. Nature 546: 593-595.
 
 
 Rockström J, L Karlberg and M Falkenmark (2011) "Global Food Production in a water-constrained world: exploring 'green' and 'blue' challenges and solutions." In Grafton, R. Q. and K. Hussey (eds.) 2011. Water Resources Planning and Management. Cambridge University Press.
 Rockström J and L Karlberg (2010) The quadruple squeeze: Defining the safe operating space for freshwater use to achieve a triply green revolution in the Anthropocene. Ambio, 39(3): 257–265. 
 Hoff H, M Falkenmark, D Gerten, L Gordon, L Karlberg and J Rockström (eds.) (2010) Journal of Hydrology: Green-Blue Water Initiative (GBI), 384(3/4): 175–306.
 
 
 Kijne, J, J Barron, H Hoff, J Rockström, L Karlberg, J Gowing, SP Wani, D Wichelns (2009) Opportunities to increase water productivity in agriculture with special reference to Africa and South Asia. Stockholm: SEI. SEI project report.
 
 Wani SP, Rockström J and Oweis TY (2009) Rainfed agriculture: unlocking the potential CABI. .
 
 
 Kartha S, Siebert CK, Mathur R, Nakicenovic N, Ramanathan V, Rockström J, Schellnhuber HJ, Srivastava L and Watt R (2009) A Copenhagen Prognosis: towards a safe climate future Stockholm Environment Institute.
 
 Rockström J, Vohland K, Lucht W, Lotze-Campen H, von Weizsäcker EU and Tariq Banuri T (2007) "Making progress within and beyond borders" In: Schellnhuber H-J, Stern N and Molina M (eds) Global sustainability: a Nobel cause, Chapter 4, pages 33–48. Cambridge University Press, 2010. .
 Rockström, Johan. "Bounding the Planetary Future: Why We Need a Great Transition." Great Transition Initiative (April 2015), https://www.greattransition.org/publication/bounding-the-planetary-future-why-we-need-a-great-transition.
 Falkenmark M and Rockström J (2004) Balancing water for humans and nature: the new approach in ecohydrology Earthscan.

Notes

External links

 Johan Rockström Potsdam Institute for Climate Impact Research (PIK)
 Johan Rockström: Breaking Boundaries: The Science Of Our Planet Netflix Documentary, 2021.
 Johan Rockström: 10 years to transform the future of humanity -- or destabilize the planet TED video, October 2020.
 Win-win solutions from a new Green Revolution People & Planet, 27 April 2011.
 Humanity needs to take 'giant leap' BBC News, 27 July 2010.
 Johan Rockström: Let the environment guide our development TED video, July 2010. Transcript html
 

Swedish hydrologists
Sustainability advocates
Academic staff of Stockholm University
Living people
1965 births
Articles containing video clips
Members of the German Academy of Sciences Leopoldina